The Georgia Viaduct is a twinned bridge that acts as a flyover-like overpass in Vancouver, British Columbia, Canada. It passes between Rogers Arena and BC Place Stadium and connects Downtown Vancouver with Main Street and Strathcona.

History
The first Georgia Street Viaduct was built between 1913 and 1915. The narrow structure included streetcar tracks that were never used. At one point, every second lamppost was removed to reduce weight. It was replaced in 1972 by the current viaduct, which is structurally separated.

The current Georgia Viaduct was envisioned in the early 1970s as forming part of an extensive freeway system for Vancouver. However, communities were opposed to the idea of demolishing structures to build the freeway system and the plan was scrapped. The freeways would have required demolishing buildings in neighborhoods including Strathcona, the Downtown Eastside and Chinatown. A predominantly Black Canadian community called Hogan's Alley was bulldozed in building the viaduct.

The viaduct opened on January 9, 1972, amid protests who attempted to block mayor Tom Campbell's limousine from reaching the western end.

Traffic flow

The viaduct's eastbound traffic is fed from Georgia Street and leads vehicles to Prior Street and Main Street. The viaduct's westbound lanes—often referred to as Dunsmuir Viaduct because they connect to Dunsmuir Street—pass to the north of Rogers Arena. The westbound traffic comes from Prior Street and Main Street, and carries vehicles and pedestrians to Dunsmuir Street, downtown which feeds into Melville Street and eventually Pender Street.

Deadpool filming
On April 5, 2015, the viaduct was closed for two weeks to allow filming of the movie Deadpool, which was released on February 12, 2016.

Demolition
On October 27, 2015, Vancouver City Council voted to demolish the twin viaducts. A new six-lane road configuration that merges Expo and Pacific boulevards is in the planning stages.

See also
 Georgia Street
 List of bridges in Canada

References

Bridges in Greater Vancouver
Viaducts in Canada
Bridges completed in 1972
Road bridges in British Columbia
Buildings and structures in Vancouver